The following is a list of people from Guinea-Bissau.

Amarildo Almeida (1976–), Olympic sprinter
Fernando Arlete (sprinter) (1979–), Olympic sprinter
Fernando Arlete (distance runner) (1968–), Olympic distance runner
Fatumata Djau Baldé, politician
Rafael Paula Barbosa (1926–2007), politician. Founded Democratic Social Front. Born in Safim.
Suzi Barbosa, politician
Francisco Benante (1954?–), lawyer and politician
José Câmnate na Bissign (1953–), Roman Catholic bishop. Born in Mansôa.
Alfredo Lopes Cabral (1946–), diplomat
Amílcar Cabral (1924–1973), political organizer and diplomat. Born in Bafatá.
Luís Cabral (1931–2009), first President. Born in Bissau.
Maria da Conceição Nobre Cabral, politician
Vasco Cabral (1926–2005), writer and politician. Born in Farim.
Anhel Cape (1978–), Olympic sprinter
Carlos Correia (1933–2021), former Prime Minister. Born in Bissau
Manuel Saturnino da Costa (1942–), former Prime Minister
Baciro Dabó (1958–2009), politician
Yaya Diallo, former Foreign Minister
Baciro Djá (1973–), former Prime Minister
Umaro Djau (1967–), international journalist and politician. Born in Gabu Region
Kimi Djabate (1975–), Afro-beat musician. Born in Tabato.
Fausto Duarte (1903–1953), novelist. Born in Cape Verde.
Umaro Sissoco Embaló (1972–), Prime Minister. Born in Bissau
Francisco Fadul (1953–), former Prime Minister
António Baticã Ferreira (1939–), poet. Born in Canchungo.
Antonieta Rosa Gomes (1959–), politician. Founder of Guinean Civic Forum–Social Democracy party (FCG/SD).
Aristides Gomes (1954–), former Prime Minister. Born in Canchungo.
Fernando Gomes, politician
Flora Gomes (1949–), film director. Born in Cadique.
Carlos Gomes Júnior (1949–), former Prime Minister. Born in Bolama.
Rogério Araújo Adolfo Herbert, diplomat
Kumba Ialá (1953–2014), former president. Born in Bula.
Faustino Imbali (1956–), former Prime Minister. Born in Ilondé.
Jessica Inchude (1996–), Olympic shot-putter
Zamora Induta (1966–), former Army Chief of Staff. Born in Bissau.
Martinho Ndafa Kabi (1957–), former Prime Minister. Born in Nhacra.
Mamadu Ture Kuruma, Army general
Taciana Lima (1983–), Olympic judoka
Carlo Lopes, economist
Ansumane Mané (c.1940–2000), former Army Chief-of-Staff
Victor Saúde Maria (1939–1999), former Prime Minister
Eneida Marta (c.1973–), singer
Bruno Medina (1987–), basketball player
Francisco Mendes (1939–1978), former Prime Minister. Born in Enxude.
Jacira Mendonca (1986–), Olympic wrestler
António Isaac Monteiro, former Foreign Minister
Edivaldo Monteiro (1976–), Olympic hurdler
Maria do Céu Monteiro, President of Supreme Court
Adiato Djaló Nandigna (1948–), politician
Manuel Serifo Nhamadjo (1958–), politician
Alamara Nhassé (1957–), former Prime Minister
Caetano N'Tchama (1955–), former Prime Minister
Carmen Pereira (1937–2016), activist and politician
Domingos Simões Pereira (1963–), former Prime Minister
Francisca Pereira (1942–), politician. Born in Bolama
Raimundo Pereira (1956–), lawyer and politician, former interim President
Benjamin Pinto Bull (1916–2005), politician and activist. Born in Bolama.
Mamadu Saliu Djaló Pires, politician
Mário Pires (1949–), former Prime Minister
Fretïmio Assocão di Planka (1911–1971), politician
Rajeshwar Prasad (1968–), entrepreneur and Cabinet Minister
Helder Proença (?–2009), politician
Adelino Mano Quetá, politician
Danilson Ricciuli (1982–), Olympic sprinter
Henrique Rosa (1946–2013), former interim President, 2003–5. Born in Bafatá
Soares Sambú, politician
Artur Sanhá (1965–), former Prime Minister
Malam Bacai Sanhá (1947–2012), former president. Born in Darsalame.
Mohamed Lamine Sanha (?–2007), Naval Chief of Staff
José Carlos Schwarz (1945–1977), poet and musician. Born in Bissau.
Veríssimo Correia Seabra (1947–2004), Army General. Born in Bissau.
Odete Semedo (1959–), writer and educator
Abdulai Silá (1958–), engineer and writer. Born in Catió.
Emílio da Silva (1988–), footballer. Born in Bissau.
Bubo Na Tchuto (1949–), former Navy Chief of Staff. Born in Incalá.
Constantino Teixeira, former Prime Minister
Filomena Mascarenhas Tipote (1969–), former Foreign Minister
Domingas Togna (1981–), Olympic runner
José Mário Vaz (1957–), President. Born in Calequisse.
Zinha Vaz (1952–), activist and politician. Born in Bissau.
João Bernardo Vieira (1939–2009), former President. Born in Bissau.
Batista Tagme Na Waie (1949–2009), former Army Chief of Staff. Born in Catio.

Guinea-Bissau
People
Guinea-Bissau